is the eleventh single by Japanese girl group Melon Kinenbi.

Release
It was released on December 3, 2003.

Chart Position
Its highest position on the Oricon weekly chart was #14.

Track listing

External links
Kawaii Kare at the Up-Front Works release list (Japanese)

2003 singles
Zetima Records singles
2003 songs